Long Thành is a rural district of Đồng Nai province in the Southeast region of Vietnam. As of 2003, the district had a population of 204,793. The district covers an area of  535 km². The district capital lies at Long Thành.

Companies based in the district include An Giang Coffee Ltd. (CTCP Cà Phê An Giang).

References

Districts of Đồng Nai province